Tara is the fourth album by black metal band Absu. It was released on May 23, 2001, by Osmose Productions. A remastered edition was supposed to come out in September 2007, but was delayed until March 2009. It contains the In the Eyes of Ioldánach EP as bonus tracks.  Early promotional material for the album stated that Mike Scaccia of Rigor Mortis/Ministry fame would contribute to the album but that did not occur.  In addition, King Diamond did contribute vocals to the album but could not be credited due to contractual restrictions.  He is credited as Masthema Mazziqim, a pseudonym used by the singer of Dolmen, a band that eventually became Absu.

Track listing
All music composed by Shaftiel, except "Tara" and "Tara (Recapitulation)" by Sir Don Shannon.

Phase One: "Ioldánach's Pedagogy"
"Tara" – 1:57
"Pillars of Mercy" – 4:22
"A Shield with an Iron Face" – 3:22
"Manannán" – 6:39
"The Cognate House of Courtly Witches Lies West of County Meath" – 4:19
"She Cries the Quiet Lake" – 4:11
"Yrp Lluyddawc" – 1:52
Phase Two: "The Cythraul Klan's Scrutiny"
"From Ancient Times (Starless Skies Burn to Ash)" – 3:54
"Four Crossed Wands (Spell 181)" – 4:47
"Vorago (Spell 182)" – 5:46
"Bron (Of the Waves)" – 1:32
"Stone of Destiny (...For Magh Slécht and Ard Righ)" – 7:47
"Tara (Recapitulation)" – 1:46
2009 Digipack Re-Release Bonus Tracks 
"V.I.T.R.I.O.L."
"Hallstatt"
"Manannán"
"Never Blow Out the Eastern Candle"

Personnel

Absu
Shaftiel – lead, rhythm, acoustic & bass guitars, voice
Equitant Ifernain – electric bass
Sir Proscriptor McGovern – voices, drums, percussion and analog synthesizers

Additional personnel
Sir Don Shannon – Bagpipes
Sir Vincent Rossi – Acoustic Guitar, Mandolin
David Harbour – Additional Keyboards and Piano
King Diamond (credited as "Masthema Mazziqim") – Additional Vocals
Ronnie Trent – Additional Vocals
Ashmedi (Melechesh) – Additional Vocals

Production
Arranged by Absu
Produced by Absu & Kol Marshall

References

2001 albums
Absu (band) albums